Park Kyung-min (born 2 August 1999) is a South Korean footballer currently playing as a defender for Seoul E-Land FC.

Career statistics

Club

References

1999 births
Living people
South Korean footballers
Association football defenders
K League 1 players
K League 2 players
Busan IPark players
Seoul E-Land FC players